Lahjebin (also Romanized as Lahjebīn) is a village in Oryad Rural District, in the Central District of Mahneshan County, Zanjan Province, Iran. At the 2006 census, its population was 29, in 5 families.

References 

Populated places in Mahneshan County